DebWrt is a discontinued, niche Linux distribution mainly installed on embedded systems (e.g. residential gateways). It was built on top of  an OpenWrt base which was used to load a fully functional version of Debian from the RootFS stored on the attached USB storage device. For easy installation and deinstallation of packages it relied on the dpkg Package management system. DebWrt used the command-line interface of Bash. There was no web-based GUI interface.

Features 
DebWrt offered all of the features provided in the stock firmware for residential gateways, such as DHCP services and wireless encryption via WEP, Wi-Fi Protected Access and WPA2. In addition it offered all of the features offered by Debian that are typically not included in a standard firmware.

Features included:
 Package manager apt-get
 Extensible configuration of your network involving VLAN with exhaustive possibilities to configure the routing itself
 Customizable methods to filter, manipulate, delay and rearrange network packets:
 Static DHCP leases
 Other devices with available Linux drivers
 Regular bug fixes and updates, even for devices no longer supported by their manufacturers

DebWrt had a fully writable file system, which allowed for package management via the dpkg package system, allowing users to install new software to meet their individual needs.  This contrasted with Linux-based firmware built using a read-only SquashFS filesystem (or similar) that offered efficient compression but no way to modify the installed software without rebuilding and flashing a complete firmware image.

Versions 
 2.0: Angel - 2009 February

See also 
 List of router firmware projects

References

External links 
 
 Linksys GPL Code Center

Embedded Linux distributions
Linux distributions